Alejo Lascano Bahamonde (July 17, 1840– December 3, 1904) was an Ecuadorian doctor-surgeon. He graduated on July 17, 1864, at the Sorbonne  Medical School under professor Noël Guéneau de Mussy. Alejo Lascano brought the first forceps to Ecuador and founded the Medicine Faculty in Guayaquil, Ecuador.

Early years
Alejo Lascano was born in Jipijapa, Manabí, Ecuador, the son of Jose Francisco Lascano, an exporting retailer of straw hats, and Josefa Bahamonde Gracés. Both were wealthy Guayaquileños. Alejo left Guayaquil on February 1, 1857, and entered the Medicine School of Paris, considered the first scientific center of the world, studying with professor Guéneau de Mussy.

After finishing school in the Laugier Clinic of Paris, he obtained the Doctorate of Medicine and Surgery on July 17, 1864.  and his thesis was received highly favourably by Professor Jacoub.

Back in Ecuador
Lascano was 24 years of age when he returned to his mother country. In Guayaquil a medicine faculty still did not exist. In 1867 he founded and organized the Facultad de Medicina del Guayas.
He was so popular with customers that he became the first doctor of the city. For that reason in 1869, García Moreno appointed Lascano Doctor for Life of the Hospital Civil de Guayaquil.

Final years
He was a connoisseur of therapeutic, chemical pharmacology and biology, as well as in botany.
Lascano had a slow cancer to the stomach. On December 3, 1904, he entered agony at seven at night and died at nine, at the age of 64.
Lascano's body rests in a sumptuous mausoleum in the General Cemetery of Guayaquil.

References

External links
  Diccionario biografico Ecuador

1840 births
1904 deaths
People from Manabí Province
Ecuadorian surgeons
University of Paris alumni
19th-century Ecuadorian people
Ecuadorian physicians
Ecuadorian academics